David Sloan may refer to:
 David Sloan (American football) (born 1972), former American football tight end
 David Sloan (footballer) (1941–2016), Northern Irish professional footballer
 David Sloan (politician), former MLA of Whitehorse West, Yukon